Homeobox protein Hox-B9 is a protein that in humans is encoded by the HOXB9 gene.

Function 

This gene is a member of the Abd-B homeobox family and encodes a protein with a homeobox DNA-binding domain. It is included in a cluster of homeobox B genes located on chromosome 17. The encoded nuclear protein functions as a sequence-specific transcription factor that is involved in cell proliferation and differentiation. Increased expression of this gene is associated with some cases of leukemia, prostate cancer and lung cancer.

Interactions 

HOXB9 has been shown to interact with BTG2 and BTG1.

See also 
 Homeobox

References

Further reading

External links 
 

Transcription factors